= All-American Protectorate, Inc. =

Right-wing political group

The All-American Protectorate, Inc., was a right-wing political group incorporated in February 1963 in St. Louis County, Missouri, under the leadership of general chairman Lovell W. George, and board-of-directors members George R. Kleine and Ernest Conn. The group aimed to provide defense training for its members, and advocated racial segregation and strict immigration controls.

The group's slogan stated that the group's aim was: "Teaching That 'Government is Management' and 'Granting Confirmation in Citizenship.'"
